The Nsenga, not to be confused with the Senga, are a Bantu ethnic tribe of Zambia and Mozambique. In Zambia, they are found in two districts of Eastern province namely Nyimba and Petauke. They are also dialects with the Nsenga Luzi of the Luangwa valley in Chief Nyalugwe, Mboloma and Lwembe and the Chikunda of Luangwa Boma (Feira). Their Senior Chief is Kalindawalo M'ndikula, who resides in Merwe 10 kilometers from Petauke Boma. The following are Nsenga Chiefs: Chiefs Mwape, Nyamphande, Nyanje, Mumbi, Sandwe, Nyalugwe, Ndake, Senior Chief Lwembe, Senior Chief Mboloma and Mwanjaw'anthu. They are well known for their culture and artwork which includes bead work and basketry. They also grow groundnuts, maize, millet and sorghum for consumption and cotton (Thonje) as cash crop, and are popular for their Mbewa (Mice), a practice which they are often teased for. The Nsenga language (also called Chinsenga) spoken by people of this tribe has been adopted by many groups in Zambia and diluted to Zambia’s widely spoken language Chinyanja or Nyanja.

Origin

The Nsenga people are believed to have migrated into Zambia around the 14th century from the Luba – Lunda kingdom as distinct language. Nsenga means land of sand. (In songye language Nsenga means earth.) the Nsenga people share much more same culture with the lala people. The strong historical assumption is that the Nsenga people followed the same pattern of movements as the lamba, swaka, lila lala and Bisa. This comes clearly as a typical comparison between nsenga and Chichewa and Nsenga and Bemba outlines much similarity to Bemba, Bisa and lala compared to Chichewa.

A typical vocabulary analysis on selected Katanga languages, further proves that Nsenga was indeed a distinct language and clearly dispels the assumption that nsenga could have been an off short of chewa. Nsenga people might have directly originated from Katanga alongside or from the same source as the lala, Bemba, lamba and the Bisa people. The Nsenga people’s chiefdom ship could have not been so strengthened compared to other tribes as seen from the fact that most of the Nsenga chiefs were installed by the British and the chewa people, a case of kalindawaro who was left as a caretaker of the land by Undi of the Chewa people.
Luba Katanga. Nsenga. English 
1.Nkulupile.    Khulupila. Trust
2. Mushike. Muzhike virgin

Chewa Influence

Historical review shows that the Nsenga people were to a large extent influenced by the Chewa people interns of language, culture and way of living. Nsenga language is mutually intelligible to the Chichewa language. This suggests that the Nsengas could have been settled in the eastern province of Zambia much earlier than the Chewa.
This was actually done before the Chewa people had actually moved toward Malawi and Mozambique.
Nsenga dialects include;

Nsenga luzi (Nsengas of the river), ambo Nsenga, kunda – Nsenga, Kunda

Ethnic groups in Zambia